Faissal Ebnoutalib (born 20 November 1970) is a German taekwondo practitioner and Olympic medalist. He is a seven-time German middleweight national champion and received the silver medal in the 80 kg division at the 2000 Summer Olympics in Sydney. 

His younger brother, Mohamed Ebnoutalib, is a German taekwondo practitioner who won the silver medal at the 2003 World Taekwondo Championships.

References

German male taekwondo practitioners
German people of Moroccan descent
Taekwondo practitioners at the 2000 Summer Olympics
Olympic silver medalists for Germany
1970 births
Living people
Olympic medalists in taekwondo
Medalists at the 2000 Summer Olympics
European Taekwondo Championships medalists
World Taekwondo Championships medalists
20th-century German people